Świat Młodych (Youth's World) was a youth magazine in Poland, published from 1949 to 1993. Part of the magazine was dedicated to scouting, but it is most remembered for its last page comics, where many leading Polish comic books artists and titles debuted (ex. Henryk Jerzy Chmielewski with Tytus, Romek i A'Tomek, Szarlota Pawel with Kleks series) or significants parts of them were published there (works of Janusz Christa, Tadeusz Baranowski and Grzegorz Rosiński).

It was one of the two major Polish youth magazines of its era.

The magazine was subject to a documentary in 2012.

References

1949 establishments in Poland
1993 disestablishments in Poland
Defunct magazines published in Poland
Magazines established in 1949
Magazines disestablished in 1993
Children's magazines published in Poland
Polish-language magazines
Youth magazines